John I of Brienne (died 12 June 1294) was the son of Alphonso of Brienne and Marie de Lusigan. His mother was the heiress of Eu, Seine-Maritime, and he succeeded his father as Count of Eu in 1270.

He married Beatrice, the daughter of Guy III, Count of Saint-Pol. They had:
 John II of Brienne, Count of Eu
 Isabelle (d. 1302 or 1307), married John II of Dampierre, Viscount of Troyes (d. c.1307)
 Jeanne (d. aft. 12 March 1325), married first Raymond VI, Viscount of Turenne (d. 1304), married second before 4 August 1314 Renauld, Lord of Picquigny, vidame of Amiens (d. 1315)
 Marguerite (d. 1310), married Guy, Viscount of Thouars (d. 1308). Guy was the son of Aimery IX and Margaret of Lusignan, who was the daughter of Hugh X of Lusignan and Isabella of Angoulême.
 Mahaut (d. aft. 1328), married Alfonso de la Cerda

John died at Clermont-en-Beauvaisis in 1294.

References

Sources

1294 deaths
Counts of Eu
House of Brienne
Year of birth unknown
Christians of the Sixth Crusade